This was the first edition of the tournament.

Gong Maoxin and Peng Hsien-yin won the title, defeating Lee Hyung-taik and Danai Udomchoke in the final, 6–4, 7–5.

Seeds

Draw

References
 Main Draw

Lecoq Seoul Open - Doubles
2015 Doubles